The 500 meters distance for women in the 2016–17 ISU Speed Skating World Cup will be contested over 10 races on six occasions, out of a total of World Cup occasions for the season, with the first occasion taking place in Harbin, Canada, on 11–13 November 2016, and the final occasion taking place in Heerenveen, Netherlands, on 11–12 March 2017.

Nao Kodaira of Japan is crowned as the World Cup champion by winning all 8 World Cup races she competed. She did not take part in third round of the World Cup in Astana.

Top three

Race medallists

Standings

References 

 
Women 0500
ISU